The Maharadia Lawana (sometimes spelled Maharadya Lawana or Maharaja Rāvaṇa) is a Maranao epic which tells a local version of the Indian epic Ramayana. Its English translation is attributed to Filipino Indologist Juan R. Francisco, assisted by Maranao scholar Nagasura Madale, based on Francisco's ethnographic research in the Lake Lanao area in the late 1960s.

It narrates the adventures of the monkey-king, Maharadia Lawana, to whom the Gods have granted immortality.

Francisco first heard the poem being sung by Maranao bards around Lake Lanao in 1968.  He then sought the help of Maranao scholar Nagasura Madale, resulting in a rhyming English translation of the epic.

Francisco believed that the Ramayana narrative arrived in the Philippines some time between the 17th to 19th centuries, via interactions with Javanese and Malaysian cultures which traded extensively with India.

By the time it was documented in the 1960s, the character names, place names, and the precise episodes and events in Maharadia Lawana's narrative already had some notable differences from those of the Ramayana.  Francisco believed that this was a sign of "indigenization", and suggested that some changes had already been introduced in Malaysia and Java even before the story was heard by the Maranao, and that upon reaching the Maranao homeland, the story was "further indigenized to suit Philippine cultural perspectives and orientations."

List of characters and places 

 Maharadiya Lawana - Ravana, a destructive king with seven heads. The son of the Sultan and Sultana of Polo Bandiyarmasir.
 Polo Bandiyarmasir - Lanka, the domain of Ravana
 Polo Nagara - Mount Kailash, depicted as an island where Maharadiya Lawana cut off his heads as a sacrifice.
 Agama Niyog - Ayodhya
 Radiya Mangandiri and Radiya Mangawarna - Rama and Lakshmana, two brother princes.
 Towan Potri Malano Tihaya, or Potri Malayla Ganding - Sita, the princess of Polo Nabanday.
 Ba’i or Sultan of Polo Nabanday - the ruler of Polo Nabanday.
 Polo Nabanday - the domain where Sita lived.
 Kabayan - an elderly woman who lived by the sea. She took in Radiya Mangandiri and Radiya Mangawarna.
 Imam
 Laksamana - a monkey who helped the two brothers. He is the story's version of Hanuman.
 Potri Langawi - the mother of Laksamana.

See also 
Darangen
Ramayana
Maranao people
Juan R. Francisco

References 

Hinduism in the Philippines
Philippine literature
Moro people
Culture of Lanao del Sur
Works based on the Ramayana
Southeast Asian culture